FC Dinaz Vyshhorod is a Ukrainian professional club from Vyshhorod which plays in Ukrainian Second League. Prior to entering professional football, the club was competing in the regional competitions of Kyiv Oblast and Ukrainian amateur competitions. 

Its home stadium is located in the village of Lyutizh and has a capacity of 1,000 spectators. Its training stadium is located in Demydiv and holds up to 380 visitors.

History
The club was founded in 1999 by Yaroslav Moskalenko.

Honours
Ukrainian Second League
  Runners-up 2020–21

Football championship of Kyiv Oblast
  Winners (1): 2011
  Runners-up (2): 2015, 2018

Football cup of Kyiv Oblast
  Winners (3): 2005, 2012, 2015
  Runners-up (1): 2006

Players

First team squad

Out on loan

Personnel

League and cup history

{|class="wikitable"
|-bgcolor="#efefef"
! Season
! Div.
! Pos.
! Pl.
! W
! D
! L
! GS
! GA
! P
!Domestic Cup
!colspan=2|Other
!Notes
|-bgcolor=SteelBlue
| align="center" |2000
| align="center" |4th "3"
| align="center" |5
| align="center" |8
| align="center" |1
| align="center" |3
| align="center" |4
| align="center" |5
| align="center" |8
| align="center" |6
| align="center" |
| align="center" |
| align="center" |
| align="center" |
|-
| align="center" |2001–2010
| align="center" colspan=13|regional competitions (Kyiv Oblast)
|-bgcolor=SteelBlue
| align="center" |2011
| align="center" |4th "2"
| align="center" |6
| align="center" |10
| align="center" |0
| align="center" |1
| align="center" |9
| align="center" |3
| align="center" |25
| align="center" |1
| align="center" |
| align="center" |
| align="center" |
| align="center" |
|-
| align="center" |2012–2018
| align="center" colspan=13|regional competitions (Kyiv Oblast)
|-bgcolor=SteelBlue
| align="center" |2018–19
| align="center" |4th "B"
| align="center" |5
| align="center" |22
| align="center" |10
| align="center" |5
| align="center" |7
| align="center" |47
| align="center" |38
| align="center" |35
| align="center" |
| align="center" |
| align="center" |
| align="center" |
|-bgcolor=PowderBlue
| align="center" |2019–20
| align="center" |3rd "A"
| align="center" |4
| align="center" |20
| align="center" |9
| align="center" |4
| align="center" |7
| align="center" |27
| align="center" |24
| align="center" |31
| align="center" | finals
| align="center" |
| align="center" |
| align="center" |
|-bgcolor=PowderBlue
|align=center|2021–22
|align=center|3rd "A"
|align=center|4
|align=center|
|align=center|	
|align=center|
|align=center|
|align=center|
|align=center|
|align=center|
|align=center|
|align=center|
|align=center|
|align=center bgcolor=lightgreen|Admitted to FL
|-bgcolor=LightCyan
|align=center|2022–23
|align=center|2nd "A"
|align=center|
|align=center|
|align=center|
|align=center|
|align=center|
|align=center|
|align=center|
|align=center|
|align=center|
|align=center|
|align=center|
|align=center|
|}

Coaches
 1999 – 1999 Valeriy Syvashenko
 2001 – 2001 Volodymyr Kozhukhov
 2003 – 2007 Volodymyr Ustynov
 2007 – 2014 Oleh Spichek
 2013 – 2013 Oleksandr Yezhakov
 2014 – 2016 Mykhailo Stelmakh
 2016 – 2017 Ihor Prodan
 2017 – 2017 Mykola Slobodianyuk
 2018 – 2021 Volodymyr Bondarenko
 2022 – present Oleksandr Holovko

Notable players
 Yevhen Chepurnenko
 Maksym Banasevych
 Serhiy Starenkyi

References

External links
 Official website

Media
Telegram
Vkontakte
Facebook
Youtube
Instagram

 
Ukrainian First League clubs
Football clubs in Kyiv Oblast
Vyshhorod Raion
Association football clubs established in 1999
1999 establishments in Ukraine